2005 Academy Awards may refer to:

 77th Academy Awards, the Academy Awards ceremony that took place in 2005
 78th Academy Awards, the 2006 ceremony honoring the best in film for 2005